Calgary/Okotoks Airranch Airport  is located  south of Calgary, Alberta, Canada. The airport is home to Access Helicopters, Foothills Helicopter Training Academy, and Calgary-Okotoks Flying School, as well as many privately owned aircraft.

The aerodrome is located in the heart of a residential community, with many houses having access to the airport's taxiway. Due to the proximity to the community the aerodrome is a noise sensitive area, and is accessible only to locally based aircraft.

Due to ongoing financial issues, the airport is scheduled to close to fixed-wing traffic in the fall of 2021.

See also
List of airports in the Calgary area

References

External links
Place to Fly on COPA's Places to Fly airport directory

Registered aerodromes in Alberta
Okotoks
Residential airparks